The Surface Laptop 2 is a Surface-series laptop produced by Microsoft. Unveiled at an event in New York City on 2 October 2018, and alongside the Surface Pro 6 released on 16 October 2018, it succeeds the Surface Laptop, released in June 2017. While maintaining a design similar to the original design of its predecessor, the Surface Laptop 2 has improved hardware specifications compared to it, an increased number of storage options and a new matte black color.

Configuration

The Surface Laptop 2 is available in four colors: Black, Platinum, Burgundy, and Cobalt Blue. Intel Core i5 and the Intel Core i7 processors are available. RAM is configurable to 8 GB or 16 GB while storage capacity is offered in 128 GB, 256 GB, 512 GB and 1 TB configurations. The laptop has no option for expandable storage.

Features 

The default operating system is Windows 10 Home. The display is a 13.5 inch 2256 x 1504 pixel 10-point touch screen with a front 720p HD camera. The laptop weighs 2.76 pounds for the Intel Core i5 models and 2.83 pounds for the Intel Core i7 model.

Hardware

The Surface Laptop 2 includes three different ports on the left hand side of the laptop, a USB-A port, a mini-display port, and the headphone jack. The right side of the device contains a magnetic surface connector port. The Surface Laptop 2 was criticized for failing to include a USB-C port and Thunderbolt 3 port.

This laptop has two omnisonic speakers, a stereo, some microphones to collect audio, and a headset jack that is located on the left-hand side of the computer.

The battery life on this laptop has about 14 hours and 20 minutes, with a charging time approximately 3-5 hours.

Timeline

References

External links
Surface Laptop 2
SellBroke Website

2
Computer-related introductions in 2018